Estonia competed at the 1928 Summer Olympics in Amsterdam, Netherlands.

Medalists

The 1928 Estonian Olympic Team
Estonia sent 20 athletes and 3 representatives to those games. 
 Representatives 
Representatives were Harald Tammer, Arnold Veiss and Johannes Villemson.
 Other delegations

Athletics

Men
Track & road events

Field events

Combined events – Men's decathlon

Boxing

Men

Sailing

The 1928 Olympic scoring system was used. 

Men

Weightlifting

Men

Wrestling

Men's Greco-Roman

Men's Freestyle

References
Official Olympic Reports
International Olympic Committee results database

External links
 EOK – Amsterdam 1928 

Nations at the 1928 Summer Olympics
1928
1928 in Estonian sport